Artūras Fomenka (born 14 February 1977) is a Lithuanian former professional footballer.

Career
He played two games in the UEFA Intertoto Cup 2000 for FC Rostselmash Rostov-on-Don. From 2008 to 2013 he played for several Uzbek League teams. In 2012, he played for Lokomotiv Tashkent in 11 matches, scoring six goals. Fomenka played on 2013 for Shurtan Guzar.

Honours
 Lithuanian A Lyga champion (2): 1997, 1998
 Lithuanian A Lyga runner-up: 1999
 Lithuanian A Lyga 3rd place: 1994
 Kazakhstan Premier League 3rd place: 2005
 Uzbek League 3rd place: 2012

External links
 

1977 births
Living people
Lithuanian footballers
Lithuanian expatriate footballers
Lithuania international footballers
Russian Premier League players
Kazakhstan Premier League players
FK Ekranas players
FC Rostov players
FC Aktobe players
FC Kairat players
FK Sūduva Marijampolė players
Lithuanian expatriate sportspeople in Kazakhstan
FC Volgar Astrakhan players
Expatriate footballers in Kazakhstan
Expatriate footballers in Russia
Buxoro FK players
FK Kareda Kaunas players
Association football forwards